Hierpiniana was a Roman era civitas (town) in the Roman province of Byzacena, Roman North Africa. The city was also the seat of an ancient bishopric, which survives today as a titular see of the Roman Catholic Church.

References

Roman towns and cities in Africa (Roman province)